The 1923 Kilkenny Senior Hurling Championship was the 29th staging of the Kilkenny Senior Hurling Championship since its establishment by the Kilkenny County Board.

On 19 October 1924, Dicksboro won the championship after a 7-04 to 3-01 defeat of Mooncoin in the final. It was their first ever championship title.

Results

Final

References

Kilkenny Senior Hurling Championship
Kilkenny Senior Hurling Championship